Melissa Erin McIntyre (born May 31, 1986)  is a Canadian former actress. She is best known for her role as Ashley Kerwin on the long-running CTV/The N teen drama Degrassi: The Next Generation.

Career
McIntyre was a participant in many community theatre plays as a child, including The Wizard of Oz and The Secret Garden.

In 1998, she was cast in Discovery Kids TV series, Real Kids, Real Adventures.

McIntyre was also a radio actress, as she played the lead role in Disco Does Not Suck. She took some time off during 1999 to participate mainly in theatre, but in 2000 McIntyre, then 13 years old, returned to television, voicing the character "Cornflower" in the PBS animated series Mattimeo: A Tale of Redwall.

In 2001, she was cast in Degrassi: The Next Generation, a spin-off to the 1980s series Degrassi High. McIntyre played Ashley Kerwin.

In 2018, McIntyre made a cameo appearance in Drake's music video "I'm Upset" with her former co-stars.

References

External links
 

Living people
1986 births
20th-century Canadian actresses
21st-century Canadian actresses
Actresses from Ontario
Canadian television actresses
Canadian child actresses
Canadian stage actresses
Canadian voice actresses
Canadian people of Irish descent
People from Port Colborne